Earle Micajah Winslow House is a historic home located at Arlington County, Virginia. It was built in 1940, and is a two-story, concrete block structure veneered in brick and covered in a smooth stucco finish that is painted white.  It has a shallow-pitched, side-gabled roof. A square projecting bay has a flat roof and a curved bay is crowned by a conical roof and a shallow hipped roof.  The house features smooth walls, flat and shallow-pitched roofs, bands of wrapping windows, rounded corners, and a complete lack of applied ornamentation in the Streamline Moderne style.

It was listed on the National Register of Historic Places in 2011.

References

Houses on the National Register of Historic Places in Virginia
Houses completed in 1940
Moderne architecture in Virginia
National Register of Historic Places in Arlington County, Virginia
Houses in Arlington County, Virginia